Tietgenbyen is a  industrial area in Denmark, southeast of Odense near European route E20. It is named after C.F. Tietgen, a businessman from Odense.

It was established in 1999 by Odense municipality. Businesses had long advocated for an industrial area near the highway. In its early years, Tietgenbyen had difficulty attracting new companies and sold only  in 1999 and 2000, but managed to reach its unofficial goal of selling at least  within 12 years. In January 2017, it contained 75 companies, and most of its lots had been sold. An  area north of Tietgenbyen, known as Tietgenbyen Nord, has been reserved by Odense Municipality for future expansions. The new land is privately owned, and just be bought by the municipality before it can be used industrially.

Tietgenbyen contains a data center owned by Facebook, with an area of 56,500 square meters. A district heating system is established in connection with the data center, distributing surplus heat to 7,000 houses (planned to be extended to 12,000 houses). Plans to build the data center were first revealed by Fyens Stiftstidene in October 2016, and confirmed by Facebook and Odense municipality in January 2017. The data center is Facebook's third outside the United States. It started operating in September 2019, although only partially. According to Fyens Stiftstidende, Facebook is ready to extend it with a third server building, and is considering adding two more.

A number of robotics firms are in Tietgenbyen, including Universal Robots, Jorgensen Engineering, and ABB.

Archeological excavations prior to building Tietgenbyen found a number of settlements from the bronze age.

References

External links 
 Tietgenbyen 

Odense